Falsgrave is a suburb of Scarborough, in the unparished area of Scarborough, in the Scarborough district, in North Yorkshire, England. Historically, the settlement of Falsgrave pre-dated the Domesday Book survey and was also the manor in the area, existing as the main administrative seat in the region long before the town of Scarborough developed. Gradually the settlement of Falsgrave became a suburb of Scarborough, and lies a little to the west of the town centre at the junction of the A64, A170 and A171 roads. Parts of the suburb were designated as a conservation area in 1985.

History
Falsgrave is recorded in the Domesday Book as being in the wapentake of Dic (later Pickering Lythe), with twenty villagers and belonging to King William, though at the Conquest, it was the property of Earl Morcar, who had ousted Tosti in 1065. During the Harrying of the North between 1069 and 1071, most of the Manor of Falsgrave was laid to waste, though to what extent is unknown especially in relation to the coastal areas. Domesday recorded the name as Walesgrif, which means Pit or hollow by the hill. The first part derives from Old Norse Hvalr (a personal name), and the second part is from the same language gryfia meaning pit. In 1086, the area was owned by King William, but its value, and the number of ploughs, had depreciated. Around 1106, the area became part of what was known as the wapentake of Pickering Lythe. Scarborough developed separately from Falsgrave, however in 1201, King John granted  of fields to the newer settlement from Falsgrave.

The Manor of Falsgrave was historically an extensive and important administrative manor in the area, with lands stretching as far north as Staintondale, as far south as Filey, and as far west as Wykeham (Steintun, Fieulac and Wicham respectively in the Domesday survey). The Manor of Falsgrave had 21 villages under its legal control (known as soke in Medieval times. In 1256, King Henry III enacted a charter that stated "..to the burgesses of Escardeburgh [Scarborough], the enlargement of the said borough, by adding the Manor of Whallesgrave [Falsgrave], with all the lands, pastures, mills, pools, and all other things to the same manor belonging..." However, in 1377, King Richard II issued an edict so that Walesgrif would be annexed to the town of Scarborough, ceasing its status as a village, and eventually becoming a suburb of Scarborough.

In 1624, a bond was agreed between the town of Scarborough and one George Fletcher (a plumber) to maintain a steady flow of water from Falsgrave through a lead pipe to the town. However, during the English Civil War, the pipe was plundered by soldiers and needed frequent replacement. During 1648, Falsgrave was where the Parliamentarian side gathered to besiege the Royalists in Scarborough Castle. They succeeded in December 1648. The nearby hills of Falsgrave Moor (or Common), were enclosed in 1774.

In December 1914, during the First World War raid on Scarborough, several shells fire from German ships out at sea rained down on Falsgrave including the park. There were no reports of casualties, but many ares suffered significant damage.

Conservation area 

In 1985, part of the suburb of Falsgrave were approved into a conservation area. It includes 22 listed buildings, including ten sets, or rows, of houses, a railway signal box, and three public houses. The signal gantry on the approach was moved to  railway station in 2010; it is still a listed structure.

Numbers 9 and 10 Falsgrave Road were originally part of a group of six houses known as Hinderwell Place. The house on the far west of this sequence of buildings was purchased by the Scarborough and Whitby Railway company upon the building of Falsgrave Tunnel underneath it. The vibrations from construction and passing trains was considered too great to leave the building occupied, and it was demolished in 1890, and where it was is now the road access to the supermarket built upon Gallows Close goods yard, which was at the northern portal of Falsgrave Tunnel. The rest of the terraced Hinderwell Place had been demolished by 1891, to make way for newer buildings. On the Opposite side of the road where the Londesborough Road diverges, was a row of Georgian terrace houses known as Victoria Place, which according to the census returns of 1851, was occupied by the Leisured Class. This denoted that they were supported by incomes from investments and property portfolios, with most houses employing servants such as cooks, housemaids and general servants.

Transport 
A turnpike was authorised and was built in 1752 connecting York with Scarborough via Malton, Yedingham Bridge, Snainton and Ayton, to travel through Falsgrave along what is now the A170 road. There are three main routes that converge in Falsgrave; the A64 from York, the A170 from Thirsk, and the A171 from Whitby.

A tram system was developed by the Scarborough Tramways Company in 1904 which ran up Falsgrave Road and through Scarborough town centre. The tram system closed in 1931.

A wide variety of buses stop in Falsgrave to and from Scarborough going to Bridlington, Helmsley, Leeds, Pickering, and Whitby, alongside local services within the immediate area.

Amenities 

Ramsdale Valley, which feeds water from Scarbrough Mere through Ramsdale Beck to the South Bay in Scarborough, had at least three watermills on it. However, the flow was sporadic, especially during the summer season, so often farmers had to use other mills at Cayton and Scalby. At least one of the mills was in use in the year 1201, and at least four were in operation by 1320. the last of which was demolished during the Civil War.

Falsgrave Park is to the south-west of the A170 road in Falsgrave. The area was first mentioned in 1283 when Robert of Scarborough suggested bringing the waters from springs in the area into the town of Scarborough. The highest point in the park was once the location of springs which fed clean water into Scarborough, taking advantage of the natural sloping topography to drain effectively towards the bay. The park has been awarded Green Flag status and has walks, woodlands, play areas, dog-free and dog-walking areas, a wildflower meadow and a stone circle, which was built in 2003.

The Anglican church in Falsgrave, St James with Holy Trinity Church, is on what is now the A64 road heading south, was built in 1885, though its ecclesiastical parish was not formed util 1893. Originally the parish was just Holy Trinity and extended from Valley Road eastwards across the railway to Oliver's Mount. However, Medieval maps show Falsgrave as having a church, but it is unsure where it was located or its style of architecture. A reference from 1496 states that a Thomas Saye of Scardeburgh left three shillings and 10 pence to "St. Clements Church, in Walegriff." It has been suggested that the church used to be located on Chapel Street, which was built over and became known as Westbourne Park. Originally of the Catholic faith, the church was a daughter church of St Mary's Church in Scarborough.

The first purpose-built Anglican church in the area was the Church of All Saints, located on All Saints Road, just off the south side of Falsgrave Road built in 1868. The rising population of the suburb prompted the vicar of St Mary's Church in Scarborough to build a daughter church in Faslgrave. The church was built in 1867, consecrated in 1868 by the archbishop of York, but it was not the seat of an ecclesiastical parish until 1875. The population of the ecclesiastical parish in 1881 was 7,650. All saints was demolished in 1975.

A Unitarian church was built on Victoria Parade and Falsgrave Road in 1877. Upon opening, the Anglican vicar of the nearby All Saints Church preached that  Unitarianism was a "terrible heresy". The building is still there, but after a fire in 1995, most it has been converted into flats, with a small area still used for Unitarian worship.

There are two primary schools in the area; Gladstone Road Primary and Thomas Hinderwell Primary Academy. There is also an upper school, St Augustine's Catholic School, which converted to Academy Status in 2019.

Governance 
Historically Falsgrave was a settlement in its own right, with the border between Falsgrave and Scarborough following a beck along what is now Gladstone Road and Columbus Ravine in the town. It was a civil parish and township within Scarborough from 1377 onwards. In 1801 the population was 279, rising to 357 in 1811, but dropping to 345 in 1821. Thereafter it increased each census year being 391 in 1831, 545 in 1841, 757 in 1851, 1,173 in 1861, 1868 in 1871, and 4,266 in 1881. The area is represented  at Westminster as part of the Scarborough and Whitby constituency.

One of the modern day wards of Scarborough was named Falsgrave Park Ward, and followed an outline of the railway line in the east, through the A170 on the west, and just encompassing the park and ride area on Seamer Road. The A64 junction and the A170 also formed the northern boundary. In the local elections of May 2019, the ward was merged with Stepney Ward (immediately to the north), and named Falsgrave & Stepney Ward. The population of the new ward in December 2020 was 9,236.

Notes

References

Sources

External links
Map showing the division of Scarborough Parish into Falsgrave and Scarborough (town)

Populated places in North Yorkshire
Former civil parishes in North Yorkshire
Scarborough, North Yorkshire